Charles or Charlie Davis may refer to:

Arts and entertainment
 Charles Davis (saxophonist) (1933–2016), American jazz saxophonist
 Charles Davis (flute player) (born 1946), American jazz flautist
 Charles Crawford Davis (1893–1966), American audio engineer and innovator 
 Charles Edward Davis (1827–1902), English architect and antiquarian
 Charles Harold Davis (1856–1933), American landscape painter
 Charles Davis (actor) (1925–2009), Irish character actor
 Charles Michael Davis (born 1981), American actor and model
 Charles Belmont Davis, writer, drama critic, and publisher
 Charles K.L. Davis, Native Hawaiian opera singer and musician
 Charlie Davis, American bandleader of The Charlie Davis Orchestra
 The real name of the Scorpio Killer in Dirty Harry (1971)

Law and politics 
 Charles Davis (land purchase agent) ( – 1887), New Zealand interpreter, writer and land purchase agent
 Charles B. Davis (1877–1943), U.S. federal judge
 Charles H. Davis (judge) (1906–1976), Illinois Supreme Court and Illinois Appellate Court Justice
 Charles Russell Davis (1849–1930), U.S. Representative from Minnesota
 Charles Augustus Davis (1828–?), Wisconsin state assemblyman
 Charles W. Davis (politician) (1827–1912), Wisconsin state senator
 Greg Davis (Mississippi politician) (Charles Gregory Davis, born 1966), mayor of Southaven, Mississippi
 Charles Davis (Australian politician) (1884–1959), South Australian politician
 Charles Davis (warden), American warden of Sing Sing
 Charles Davis (Vermont judge) (1789–1863), Vermont attorney and judge
 Charlie Davis (politician) (born 1965), member of the Missouri House of Representatives
 Charles J. Davis (1910–1968), Michigan politician
 Sir Charles Davis, 1st Baronet, Lord Mayor of London
 Charles R. Davis (1945–2004), American educator and politician

Military 
 Charles Henry Davis (1807–1877), U.S. naval officer
 Charles C. Davis (1830–1909), American Medal of Honor recipient
 Charles P. Davis (1872–1943), American Medal of Honor recipient
 Charles W. Davis (1917–1991), U.S. Army officer and Medal of Honor recipient

Sports

American football
 Charlie Davis (defensive tackle) (born 1951), former American football defensive tackle
 Charlie Davis (running back) (born 1952), American football player
 Charles Davis (defensive back) (born 1964), American college football player and television commentator
 Charles Davis (tight end) (born 1983), American football player

Basketball
 Charlie Davis (basketball) (born 1949), American basketball player
 Charles Davis (basketball, born 1958), American basketball player
 Charles Davis (basketball, born 1984), naturalized Azerbaijani basketball player

Other sports
 Charlie Davis (footballer) (1904–1967), English professional footballer
 Charlie Davis (baseball) (1927–2016), American baseball player
 Charles Davis (sport shooter) (1927–2018), American Olympic sport shooter
 Charlie Davis (cricketer) (born 1944), West Indian cricketer
 Charles Davis (American athlete) American visually-impaired runner
 Charles Davis (boxer), American boxer

Others 
 Charles Henry Davis (businessman) (1865–1951), American businessman and civil engineer
 Charles H. Davis (fl. 1890), gold prospector at Golden Fleece Mine, Colorado
 Charles Davis (theologian) (1923–1999), British Jesuit theologian, famous for publicly leaving the Catholic Church in 1966
 Charles Till Davis (1929–1998), American medieval historian
 Sir Charles Thomas Davis, British civil servant
 Charles Davis Limited, a department store company in Hobart, Tasmania
 Charles William Davis (born 1947), American serial killer

See also
 Charles Davis Limited, company formed in 1847 in Tasmania
 Chuck Davis (disambiguation)
 Charles Davies (disambiguation)